SS Sea Hare may refer to one of two Type C3-S-A2 ships built for the United States Maritime Commission:

  (MC hull number 1553), built by Ingalls Shipbuilding; acquired by the United States Navy and converted to  USS Goshen (APA-108); sold for commercial service in 1947; scrapped in 1973
  (MC hull number 884), built by Western Pipe and Steel; delivered in April 1945; sold 1947; scrapped in 1973

These ships were named after the shell-less marine mollusks known as sea hares.

Ship names